F. H. Gunasekara was the 27th Surveyor General of Sri Lanka. He was appointed in 1966, succeeding J. C. Chanmugam, and held the office until 1967. He was succeeded by P. U. Ratnatunga.

References

G